Thomas Jay Craft (born November 12, 1953) is an American football coach. He is the head football coach at Riverside Community College in Riverside, California.  Craft served as the head football coach at San Diego State University from 2002 to 2005 and at Palomar College in San Marcos, CA from 1983 to 2000. Craft has also been the associate head coach and offensive coordinator at Mount San Antonio College in Walnut, California.

Under his tenure, San Diego State developed a reputation of playing the tough teams well but lacked consistency and never had a winning season. In 2004, San Diego State lost to Michigan 24–21, and in 2005, where it pushed Ohio State at home, and lost 24–21 to TCU. San Diego State fired Craft at the end of the 2005 season.

Craft is a graduate of Pacific Grove High School, in Pacific Grove, California, and thereafter played quarterback at San Diego State.

After serving as an assistant coach at Palomar  from 1977 to 1982 and with the school openly questioning its commitment to football, he took over head coaching duties in 1983. After a pair of 4–6 seasons, the Comets' fortunes began to improve. By the time Craft left the San Marcos school for the Aztec coordinator's job, Palomar was coming off a three-year stretch of 31–2, had an offense ranked among the nation's top five for five consecutive years and was sporting two national championships. Craft compiled an overall record of 115–56 and three national junior college football championships at Palomar.

At Palomar, Craft taught and coached seven All-American quarterbacks, which include: Duffy Daughtery, Scott Barrick, Brett Salisbury, Andy Loveland, Tom Luginbill, Greg Cicero, and Andy Goodenough.

Head coaching record

College

References

1953 births
Living people
American football quarterbacks
Monterey Peninsula Lobos football players
Sportspeople from Iowa City, Iowa
San Diego State Aztecs football coaches
San Diego State Aztecs football players
Riverside City Tigers football coaches
People from Pacific Grove, California